Sazonovsky is a rural locality (a khutor) in Rossoshinskoye Rural Settlement, Uryupinsky District, Volgograd Oblast, Russia. The population was 50 as of 2010. There are 2 streets.

Geography 
Sazonovsky is located 34 km southwest of Uryupinsk (the district's administrative centre) by road. Safonovsky is the nearest rural locality.

References 

Rural localities in Uryupinsky District